Fogo Priory was the a Tironensian monastic community in Berwickshire, Scottish Borders, dedicated to St Nicholas. It was founded sometime between 1253 and 1297 by a local landlord named Patrick Corbet, who granted lands to Kelso Abbey in order to establish a cell there. Only two of the priors of Fogo are known.

Bibliography
 Cowan, Ian B. & Easson, David E., Medieval Religious Houses: Scotland With an Appendix on the Houses in the Isle of Man, Second Edition, (London, 1976), p. 67
 Watt, D.E.R. & Shead, N.F. (eds.), The Heads of Religious Houses in Scotland from the 12th to the 16th Centuries, The Scottish Records Society, New Series, Volume 24, (Edinburgh, 2001), p. 83

See also
 Fogo, Scottish Borders
 Prior of Fogo
List of places in the Scottish Borders
List of places in Scotland

Listed monasteries in Scotland
Tironensian monasteries
Christian monasteries established in the 13th century
Buildings and structures in the Scottish Borders
History of the Scottish Borders
Former Christian monasteries in Scotland